Shah is a common surname in India, Nepal, Bangladesh and Pakistan.

Shah (pronounced , "king") is a title given to the emperors, kings, princes and lords of Iran (historically known as Persia in the West).

History 
In the Gujarat and Rajasthan region, the name 'Shah', 'Sha' or 'Sah' may be derived from Gujarati sah meaning "merchant" (from Sanskrit sadhu meaning "honest, good") and Prakrit Sahu, while the actual spelling "Shah" was popularized by the Persian word for King. As a result, especially in Western culture, use of the spelling "Shah" has become far more pronounced than the other variants. The word Sadhu/Sahu is also separately used to indicate a holy man, such as a Jain monk (see Namokar Mantra). The Indian surnames "Shah" and "Sahu" are variants of one another which have evolved from the word "sah" over time.
Another variant is Sheth.

One early use of the title Sadhu occurs in an inscription on an AD 850 Parshvanth image in the Akota Bronzes.

In numerous 12–13th century inscriptions the shravaka who installed the image is given the title "Sahu".

For example:
 A 12th century Jain altarpiece in Los Angeles County Museum of Art mentions Grahapati Sadhu Kundha
 Vibudh Shridhar mentions his patron Nattal Sahu, a 12th-century merchant prince in Delhi.
 From Gwalior: Here both Sah and Sadhu have been used in the 1510 inscription.
 From Ahar, Madhya Pradesh: " Samvat 1210 vaishakha sudi 13 grahpatyanvayae sahu shrisadhu bharya mana tayoh .. ete paNamanti nityam."

Here the word Sahu is equivalent to the Sanskrit word "sadhu". Some inscriptions use "sadhu" itself :

 From Bahuriband (Katni, MP): "Svasti shri samvat 1070 phalgunavadi ...
madhavannandinugrahitah sadhu-shri sarvadharah .."

The word Sadhu here does not mean a monk but a "gentleman". Some inscriptions abbreviate sahu by just "sa" just like the abbreviation in English, "Mr."
In some business communities, genealogies are recited during marriages, where all ancestors would be respectfully called "sahu".
The term "sahukari" means the profession of banking/trading, and is derived from Sahu (Sanskrit "Sadhu") and kar (Sanskrit for doer).
In the Bundelkhand Jain community, the father-in-law (or son's/daughter's father-in-law) used to be called "sahaji". Thus the words "Shah" etc. all indicate a respected member of the mercantile community. 
Today it is used by Gujarati business communities.

People with the surname
This list includes people with both the Indian surname Shah and the surname of Persian origin meaning king. Having the name, also in the Persian meaning, does not necessarily indicate a royal status or origin of the person so named. Like the surname "King" in English, it is borne by various people not connected to any Royal dynasty. Notable people with the surname include:

 Amit Shah, Indian politician
 Amin Shah, Indian politician
 Arvind Victor Shah, (born 1940), Swiss engineer, educator and scientist
 Ashiesh Shah, Indian architect and designer
 Bahadur Shah of Nepal, Nepalese states unifier and Prince Regent
 Balen Shah, Nepalese rapper, structural engineer, and politician
 Birendra Bir Bikram Shah, Nepalese monarch from the house of Shah dynasty
 Bulleh Shah (c.1680–c.1758), Punjabi Sufi poet
 Eddy Shah, British businessman and writer
 Ema Shah (born 1981), Kuwaiti singer, composer, and director
 Fahad Shah, Kashmiri journalist
 Farah Shah, Pakistani actress and host
 Fatima Shah (1914-2002), Pakistani physician and disability activist
 Harmonica Shah (born 1946), American blues harmonicist and singer
 Hetul Shah (born 1999), Indian chess player
 Jawahar Shah (born 1955), Indian homeopath
 Jigar Shah (born 1974), Indian businessman
 Kiran Shah (born 1956), Kenyan-born actor and stuntman
 Khushdil Shah, Pakistani cricketer
 Mahendra Bir Bikram Shah, Nepalese nationalist monarch
 Nagambal Shah, Indian-American mathematician and statistician
 Naseem Shah, Pakistani cricketer
 Naz Shah (born (1973), British Labour Party politician
 Neel Shah, American physician
 Neer Shah, Nepalese actor, musician, and filmmaker
 Nirav D. Shah, American epidemiologist, economist and attorney
 Owais Shah, English cricketer
 Paul Shah, Nepalese model and actor.
 Pooja Shah (born 1979), British Asian actress
 Prithivi Narayan Shah, Nepalese monarch from the house of Shah dynasty
 Rahil Shah, Indian cricketer
 Raj Shah, American politician
 Rajendra Keshavlal Shah (1913-2010), lyrical poet who wrote in Gujarati
 Raline Shah (born 1985), Indonesian actress
 Rajiv Shah (born 1973), administrator of the United States Agency for International Development
 Ravindu Shah (born 1972), Kenyan cricketer
 Ray Shah (born 1978), contestant on the fourth series of the British Big Brother
 Rishi Shah (born 1985/86), American billionaire, founder of Outcome Health
 Roger Shah, German electronic music producer
 Safia Shah, author
 Saira Shah, English author, reporter and documentary filmmaker
 Saleem Shah, Indian-American psychologist
 Salman Shah, Pakistani economist
 Salman Shah (actor), Bangladeshi actor
 Sanjay Shah, Dubai-based businessman
 Satish Shah, Indian film and television actor
 Tejal Shah (born 1979), Indian visual artist, curator
 Yasir Shah, Pakistani cricketer

See also
 Nattal Sahu
 Singhai
 Sheth 
Saha (surname)
Shah

References

Indian surnames
Gujarati-language surnames
Bengali Muslim surnames